Guido Vadalá (born 8 February 1997) is an Argentine footballer who plays as a forward for Club Atlético Sarmiento in the Argentine Primera División.

Vadalá began playing football in the Club Atlético Provincial youth system. He was a highly regarded prospect, and made a strong impression while training with FC Barcelona at age 12.
He signed his first professional contract with Boca Juniors in 2014. Vadalá made his competitive debut in a Copa Libertadores group stage match in February 2015, before he went on loan to Unión de Santa Fe where he scored one goal in 19 matches.

References

External links

1997 births
Living people
Argentine footballers
Argentine expatriate footballers
Boca Juniors footballers
Unión de Santa Fe footballers
Universidad de Concepción footballers
Deportes Tolima footballers
Charlotte Independence players
Chilean Primera División players
Argentine Primera División players
Categoría Primera A players
Association football forwards
Argentine expatriate sportspeople in Chile
Argentine expatriate sportspeople in Italy
Argentine expatriate sportspeople in Colombia
Expatriate footballers in Chile
Expatriate footballers in Italy
Expatriate footballers in Colombia
USL Championship players
Footballers from Rosario, Santa Fe